"The Wings of the Dove" was an American television play broadcast on January 8, 1959 as part of the CBS television series, Playhouse 90.  The cast included Dana Wynter, James Donald, and Isabel Jeans. Robert Stevens was the director. The teleplay was written by Meade Roberts as an adaptation of the novel, The Wings of the Dove, by Henry James.

Plot
In the early 20th century, Kate Croy moves into the London home of her wealthy aunt. The aunt forbids Croy from seeing the writer whom she loves.

Cast
The cast included the following:

 Dana Wynter - Kate Croy
 James Donald - Miles Enshaw
 Isabel Jeans - Aunt Maude
 Inga Swenson - Milly Theale
 John Baragrey - Lord Mark
 Henry Daniell - Lionel Croy
 Lurene Tuttle - Susan Stringham
 Alan Napier - Sir Luke
 Mavis Neal - Lady Mills
 Sally Cooper - Marian Condrip
 Bryan Grant - The Young Gentleman
 Doris Lloyd - The Elderly Woman
 Sheila Keddy - The Nurse
 Clive L. Halliday - The Old Man
 Grazia Narciso - The Bewigged Lady
 Albert Carrier - The Escort
 Herbert Deans - The Butler
 A.G. Vitanza - The Servant
 Dino Bolognese - The Artist

Production
The program aired on January 8, 1959, on the CBS television series Playhouse 90. Robert Stevens was the director. The teleplay was written by Meade Roberts as an adaptation of the novel by Henry James.

References

1959 American television episodes
Playhouse 90 (season 3) episodes
1959 television plays